Lady Jeongmok of the Gangneung Wang clan was the daughter of Wang-Gyeong who became the 8th wife of Taejo of Goryeo and mother of Dowager Queen Sunan. Later, in 922, General Wang Sun-sik from Myeongju (명주장군 왕순식) was inside fighting, Wang-Gyeon was given a royal fortress, a government office and a residence.

References

External links
정목부인 on Encykorea .

Year of birth unknown
Year of death unknown
Consorts of Taejo of Goryeo
People from Gangneung